Li Qiaoming (born April 1961) is a general of the Chinese People's Liberation Army (PLA), currently serving as commander of the PLA Ground Force. He served as commander of the Northern Theater Command from September 2017 to September 2022.

Biography
Li Qiaoming was born in April 1961 in Yanshi, Henan Province and enlisted in the People's Liberation Army (PLA) in 1976. He successively served as Chief of Staff of the 361st Regiment, Commander of the 364th Regiment, Chief of Staff of the 124th Division, Deputy Chief of Staff of the 42nd Group Army, and Commander of the 124th Division of the 42nd Army.

He was appointed Chief of Staff of the 41st Group Army in January 2010, (In July 2011 he was awarded the rank of major general) and promoted to Commander of the 41st Army in September 2013. In 2013 he wrote an article about soviet army "nonparty tragedy". In February 2016, he became Commander of the Northern Theater Command Ground Force, and awarded the rank of lieutenant general a few months later. In September 2017, he was promoted again to Commander of the Northern Theater Command, succeeding General Song Puxuan, who had been appointed Director of the Logistic Support Department of the Central Military Commission.

In October 2017, he was elected as a member of the 19th Central Committee of the Communist Party of China.

In December 2019, he was promoted to the rank of general.

In December 2022, Li was commissioned as commander of the PLA Ground Force.

References

1961 births
Living people
People from Yanshi
People's Liberation Army generals from Henan
Commanders of Northern Theater Command
Members of the 19th Central Committee of the Chinese Communist Party
Politicians from Luoyang
People's Republic of China politicians from Henan
Chinese Communist Party politicians from Henan